Gokarna may refer to:

Places
 Gokarna, Karnataka, a town in Karnataka, India
 Gokarna, West Bengal, a village in West Bengal, India
 Gokarnamatam, a village in Andhra Pradesh, India
 Trincomalee, a city in Eastern Province, Sri Lanka also known in its early history as Gokarna (Sanskrit) or Gokanna (Pali)
 Gokarna, Bangladesh, a village in Chittagong Division, Bangladesh
 Gokarneshwar, a municipality in Kathmandu District in central Nepal

Other uses
 Gokarna (film), a 2003 film produced in India
 Gokarna Aunsi, a late August or early September celebration in Nepal
 Gokarna Math, one of the 24 mathas of the Dvaita order
 Gokarnanatheshwara Temple, a temple in Mangaluru, India